Parafomoria cistivora is a moth of the family Nepticulidae. It is found in the western Mediterranean region.

The length of the forewings is 2.3-2.6 mm for males and 2.1-2.6 mm for females. Adults are on wing from the end of August to the end of October. There is probably one generation per year.

The larvae feed on Cistus ladanifer, Cistus laurifolius, Cistus monspeliensis, Cistus populifolius and Cistus salviifolius. They mine the leaves of their host plant. The mine consists of a long, often contorted, narrow corridor that hardly widens towards the end. The frass is deposited in an interrupted central line that never occupies over one third of the corridor width. Pupation takes place outside of the mine.

External links
Fauna Europaea
bladmineerders.nl
The Cistaceae-feeding Nepticulidae (Lepidoptera) of the western Palaearctic region

Nepticulidae
Moths of Europe
Moths described in 1871